Kunal Naren Saikia (born 19 June 1988) is an Indian first-class cricketer who plays for Assam in domestic cricket. Saikia is a right-handed batter and wicket-keeper. He made his first-class debut against Goa at Guwahati in the 2006-07 Ranji Trophy.

References

External links
 
 

1988 births
Living people
Indian cricketers
Assam cricketers
People from Lakhimpur district
Cricketers from Assam
Wicket-keepers